Robert Daniel Didier (born February 16, 1949) is an American former catcher in Major League Baseball who played for three different teams from 1969 through 1974.

He entered the majors in 1969 with the Atlanta Braves, playing with them four years before joining the Detroit Tigers (1973) and Boston Red Sox (1974). In his rookie season, Didier appeared in a career-high 114 games, helping his team win the National League West Division title. At the end of the season, he finished fourth in the Rookie of the Year vote (behind Ted Sizemore, Coco Laboy and Al Oliver and over Larry Hisle) and also was named to the 1969 Topps All-Star Rookie Roster. After that, he suffered arm and back problems and played only in 133 games over the next five seasons. While in Atlanta, he became the preferred catcher of knuckleballer Phil Niekro.

The son of Mel Didier, a longtime scout and player development executive in the major leagues, Bob Didier was born in Hattiesburg, Mississippi.

In a six-season career, he was a .229 hitter (172-for-751) with 32 RBI and 32 runs without home runs. As a catcher, he collected 1276 outs, 119 assists, and committed only nine errors in 1404 chances, for a .994 fielding percentage.

Following his playing retirement, Didier managed in the minor leagues for the Tigers, Chicago White Sox, Los Angeles Dodgers and Chicago Cubs organizations.

In the majors, he has coached for the Oakland Athletics (1984–86) and Seattle Mariners (1989–90), and also has worked as a catching coordinator in the Arizona Diamondbacks system.

In 2007 Didier was part of the coaching staff at Major League Baseball's Academy in Tirrenia, Italy.

He managed the Yakima Bears from 2008 to 2010.

References

External links

1949 births
Living people
Atlanta Braves players
Baseball players from Mississippi
Boston Red Sox players
Chicago Cubs scouts
Detroit Tigers players
Greenwood Braves players
Kinston Eagles players
Iowa Oaks players
Major League Baseball catchers
Major League Baseball third base coaches
New York Yankees scouts
Oakland Athletics coaches
Pawtucket Red Sox players
Richmond Braves players
Seattle Mariners coaches
Sportspeople from Hattiesburg, Mississippi
Syracuse Chiefs managers
Toledo Mud Hens players
West Palm Beach Braves players